Qingyuan railway station is a railway station located in Qingcheng District, Qingyuan, Guangdong, China.

Opened on 26 December 2009, Qingyuan railway station is located some distance to the east of the Qingyuan city, but is closer to it than Yuantan railway station on the Beijing–Guangzhou railway.

References

Railway stations in Guangdong
Railway stations in China opened in 2009
Stations on the Wuhan–Guangzhou High-Speed Railway